Clement Temile is a Nigerian football coach and former player who was the manager of English side Kentish Town, who played at Step 5 of the English Non-League football pyramid. He is the father of Israeli international Toto Tamuz, who was raised by an Israeli woman after Temile, who was playing in Israel at the time, returned to Nigeria. Clement is also the uncle of Omonigho Temile and Frank Temile.

Education
Temile attended Hussey College Warri.

Career

Playing career
During his playing career he played for Bendel Insurance in Nigeria and Beitar Netanya in Israel, as well as the Nigerian national side. He appeared in one FIFA World Cup qualifying match in 1984.

Management career
Contrary to a report in an English newspaper, Temile was not offered the job of Nigeria manager. In April 2008 according to Chairman of NFA Technical Committee, Chief Taiwo Ogunjobi, Temile was never approached to take over the vacant position of the Nigerian national side.

References

Year of birth missing (living people)
Living people
Association football wingers
Nigerian footballers
Nigeria international footballers
Nigerian expatriate footballers
Expatriate footballers in Israel
Beitar Nes Tubruk F.C. players
Nigerian football managers
Bendel Insurance F.C. players
Place of birth missing (living people)
Clement
Hussey College Warri alumni